William Edward Mundy (June 28, 1889 – September 28, 1958) was a first baseman in Major League Baseball in 1913. He batted and threw right-handed. Mundy appeared in sixteen games for the Boston Red Sox, recording a .255 batting average with four runs batted in in his only major league season.

External links 
Bill Mundy - Baseball-Reference.com

1889 births
1958 deaths
Baseball players from Ohio
Major League Baseball first basemen
Boston Red Sox players
People from Salineville, Ohio
Portsmouth Pirates players
Worcester Busters players
Lewiston Cupids players
Bradford Drillers players
Erie Sailors players